The Vodnik Monument or Valentin Vodnik Monument, is dedicated to the Carniolan priest, poet and journalist Valentin Vodnik (1758−1819). It stands at Vodnik Square in Ljubljana, the capital of Slovenia, in the immediate vicinity of the Ljubljana Central Market.

The idea for the statue was put forward by the politician Lovro Toman on the occasion of the 100th anniversary of the poet's birth and was organised by the Writers' Support Society in collaboration with the Slovene Society. It was made from 1887 to 1889 in bronze and with a simple stone pedestal in Vienna by the young sculptor  (1859−1935) and was unveiled on 30 June 1889 with a three-day celebration as the first public Slovene national monument. The monument has a bronze verse by Vodnik on its back side and the bronze inscription Vodnik on its front side. The verse is written in Slovene and says: "No daughter no son, to come after me, enough memory done, my songs sing of me."

Because Vodnik was an ardent supporter of the Illyrian Provinces, which he saw as fostering Slovene linguistic development, the letters R and F, meaning République Française (a reference to the First French Republic), as well as a laurel wreath, a sheaf and a swearing arm above it, and the inscription A Vodnik below the wreath, were added to the pedestal in 1929, soon after the 120th anniversary of the establishment of the Provinces. These are all made of bronze. They were a gift by France and were also decorated with the French tricolour.

References

External links

monument
Monuments and memorials in Ljubljana
1889 sculptures
Illyrian Provinces
Statues of writers